Ņukši Parish was an administrative territorial entity of Ludza Municipality, Latvia.

Towns, villages and settlements of Ņukši Parish

References 

Parishes of Latvia
Ludza Municipality